The Myanmar Medical Association (abbreviated MMA; formerly the Burma Medical Association) is Myanmar's only professional organisation of physicians. Founded in 1949 by Dr. Shwe Thwin, the association has a current membership of approximately 17,000 members (2011). It is administered by a central executive committee and is divided into 33 different societies dedicated to a broad range of medical specialties. MMA holds an annual conference and also provides continued medical education for its members. MMA publishes the Myanmar Medical Journal.

Leadership
Past presidents of the organisation include:

 1949–1950: Ba Thaw
 1951–1953: Ba Than Chain
 1953–1954: Maung Gale
 1954–1955: Ba Than
 1955–1956: Min Sein
 1957: Yin May
 1958: Maung Maung Gyi
 1959: T. Chan Taik
 1960: Sein Maung
 1961: Shwe Zan
 1963: Ko Gyi
 1964: Ba Than (Setkya)
 1965: Khin Maung Win
 1966: U E
 1967: San Lwin
 1968: Maung Maung Than
 1969–1970: Pe Kyin
 1971–1972: Aung Thein
 1973–1974: Kyaw Maung
 1975–1976: Hla Kyi
 1977: Maung Maung Aye
 1978: Maung Maung Taik
 1979–1980: Shwe Tin
 1980–1981: Myat Kyi Than
 1981–1982: Hla Myint
 1983: Khin Maung Nyein
 1984–1988: Tin U
 1989–1992: Thet Hta Way
 1993–1996: Kyu Kyu Swe
 1997–1998: Ye Myint
 1999–2005: Myo Myint
 2006–2013: Kyaw Myint Naing
 2014–2019: Rai Mra
 2020–present: Htin Aung Saw

References

Organizations established in 1949
Medical and health organisations based in Myanmar
1949 establishments in Burma